2000 Denmark Open is a darts tournament, which took place in Denmark in 2000.

Results

References

2000 in darts
2000 in Danish sport
Darts in Denmark